Obulom and Ochichi constitute is a Central Delta language of Rivers State, Nigeria.

References

Indigenous languages of Rivers State
Central Delta languages